In oceanography, the sverdrup (symbol: Sv) is a non-SI metric unit of volumetric flow rate, with  equal to . It is equivalent to the SI derived unit cubic hectometer per second (symbol: hm3/s or hm3⋅s−1): 1 Sv is equal to 1 hm3/s. It is used almost exclusively in oceanography to measure the volumetric rate of transport of ocean currents. It is named after Harald Sverdrup.  

One sverdrup is about five times what is carried by the world’s largest river, the Amazon. In the context of ocean currents, a volume of one million cubic meters may be imagined as a "slice" of ocean with dimensions  ×  ×  (width × length × thickness). At this scale, these units can be more easily compared in terms of width of the current (several km), depth (hundreds of meters), and current speed (as meters per second).

The sverdrup is distinct from the SI sievert unit or the non-SI svedberg unit. All three use the same symbol. They are not related.

History 
The sverdrup is named in honor of the Norwegian oceanographer, meteorologist and polar explorer Harald Ulrik Sverdrup (1888–1957), who wrote the 1942 volume The Oceans, Their Physics, Chemistry, and General Biology together with Martin W. Johnson and Richard H. Fleming.

In the 1950s and early 1960s both Soviet and North American scientists contemplated the damming of the Bering Strait, thus enabling temperate Atlantic water to heat up the cold Arctic Sea and, the theory went, making Siberia and northern Canada more habitable. As part of the North American team, Canadian oceanographer Maxwell Dunbar found it "very cumbersome" to repeatedly reference millions of cubic meters per second. He casually suggested that as a new unit of water flow, "the inflow through Bering Strait is one sverdrup". At the Arctic Basin Symposium in October 1962, the unit came into general usage.

Examples 

References

Oceanography
Units of flow
Non-SI metric units